The New School Dhaka (NSD) is a private English medium school in Dhaka, Bangladesh that offers International General Certificate of Secondary Education (IGCSE) as well as Advanced Level Qualifications under Edexcel, a Pearson company. It caters to the community of Banani, Dhaka.

History 
The school was set up in 2007 in response to the need for an international school in the fast-growing community of Banani.

Curriculum 
NSD offers a complete primary, secondary and high school programme leading to the International General Certificate of Secondary Education (IGCSE) and International Advanced Level (IAL) examinations under Edexcel, UK which are conducted by the British Council in Dhaka.

References

External links 
 

Schools in Dhaka District
Educational institutions established in 2007
2007 establishments in Bangladesh